Complete results for Women's Giant Slalom competition at the 2013 World Championships. It was held on February 14, the eighth race of the championships, and 139 athletes from 55 countries competed.

Results
The first run started at 10:00 local time (UTC+1) and the second run at 13:30.

References

Giant slalom, women's
2013 in Austrian women's sport
FIS